Héctor Recalde (born 28 May 1938 in Buenos Aires) is an Argentinian lawyer and politician who specializes in labor and political law. He was a national deputy for Buenos Aires province between 2005 and 2017. He was the spokesman for the Front for Victory in the Chamber of Deputies.

Early life and education
Born into a working-class family in the Buenos Aires neighborhood of Colegiales, Recalde graduated from the University of Buenos Aires in 1961. He has been a Peronist since his youth.

Career

Academic career
At the University of Buenos Aires, Recalde has served for many years as a Consulting Professor in the Faculty of Social Sciences, as a Professor of Law in the Faculty of Law, and as a Tenured Professor of Labor Administrative Law in the Faculty of Social Sciences.

Political and union activities
Since 1964, Recalde has been a lawyer for the General Confederation of Labor (CGT), where he was an advisor to the textile leader Andrés Framini. Throughout his career, he also has served as a legal advisor to various trade-union organizations in Argentina, and has also been associated with CGT-Brazil, that country's second-largest labor-union federation.

After a coup d'état overthrew Isabel Perón on 24 March 1976, Recalde went into exile for a year in Uruguay. Returning to Argentina, he was in charge of writing the portion of the Justicialist Party’s election program relating to labor issues. Later, when CGT leader Saúl Ubaldini ran for governor of the province of Buenos Aires, Recalde headed the accompanying list of legislative candidates.

During the attempted military coup of 1987, Recalde was commissioned to draft the CGT resolution stating that, if the coup continued, the CGT would call a general strike in defense of republican institutions.

When Hugo Moyano became general secretary of the CGT in 2004, Recalde was named its head legal adviser.

National deputy (2005-2017)
In 2005, running as a candidate of the Justicialist Party in the province of Buenos Aires, he won a seat in the National Congress, taking office on 10 December of that year. He won re-election five times. In 2009, he and Ernesto Sanz were named by fellow deputies, congressional staffers, advisors, and the writers and readers of Parliamentary Weekly as the most outstanding legislators of the year.

In 2012, a conflict over a new labor law of which Moyano disapproved led him to accuse Recalde of treating workers with disrespect, permanently ended the friendship between Recalde and Moyano.

Moyano’s accusation notwithstanding, Recalde in fact introduced many bills aimed at improving workers’ lives. He also proposed the repeal of regulations that the last military dictatorship had imposed on media and financial enterprises and supported the re-nationalization of firms that had been privatized during the 1990s. He also advocated for the re-nationalization of the social-security system. During his later years in Congress, Recalde called for profit participation by employees of private firms.

While serving in Congress, Recalde served as president of the Labor Legislation Commission and was a member of the Commissions for the Analysis and Monitoring of Tax and Social-Security Regulations; Economy; Justice; Criminal Legislation; and Petitions, Powers and Regulations.

Memberships
In 2003 he was elected as member of the Commission for the Legal Analysis of Social Protest, a subdivision of the Human Rights Secretariat, part of the Ministry of Justice, Security and Human Rights of the Argentine Republic. He has also served as president of the Labor Law Commission of the Buenos Aires Bar Association and as a member of the Advisory Council of the Labor Lawyers Association.

Books
Recalde has written many legal articles and the following books:
Reforma Laboral – Flexibilidad sin Empleo (1994)
Política Laboral 1989-1995 (1995; 1996)
Un caso judicial, Asignaciones – Vales alimentarios (1996)
Encuadramiento sindical y convencional (1996)
Crónica de una ley negociada: Ley 25.250, de reforma laboral (2000)
Política Laboral Ilustrada (2001)
La tercera Década Infame (2003)

He is also the co-author of these works:  
Normalización sindical - Régimen electoral ley 23.071 (1984)
La negociación colectiva (1989)
Nuevo régimen de asociaciones sindicales  
Dos leyes regresivas. Análisis - crítica (1999)

Personal life
Recalde is the father of three children. Mariano was president of Aerolíneas Argentinas and is currently a National Senator for Buenos Aires; Leandro, like his father, is a labor lawyer; Mora is an actress.

References

Politicians from Buenos Aires
20th-century Argentine lawyers
1938 births
Living people
Members of the Argentine Chamber of Deputies elected in Buenos Aires Province
Justicialist Party politicians
University of Buenos Aires alumni
Academic staff of the University of Buenos Aires